Barbara Mary Scott  (née Barnett; born 21 July 1939) is a former Australian politician. She was a member of the Western Australian Legislative Council representing the South Metropolitan Region from 1993 to 2009. Elected to Parliament in the 1993 state election and subsequently re-elected in the 1996, 2001 and 2005 state elections, she served as a member of the Liberal Party.

Scott grew up in the wheatbelt town of Walgoolan and after completing her teaching qualification she returned to the country as a teacher.

After entering parliament Scott acted as the shadow minister for Culture and the Arts (March 2005 - April 2006), shadow minister for Censorship and Children (March 2005 to present) and shadow minister for the Arts (April 2006 to present).

In February 2008 Scott announced that she would retire from politics at the next state election and would not seek preselection.

References

External links 

1939 births
Living people
Members of the Western Australian Legislative Council
Liberal Party of Australia members of the Parliament of Western Australia
Recipients of the Medal of the Order of Australia
People from Merredin, Western Australia
21st-century Australian politicians
Women members of the Western Australian Legislative Council
21st-century Australian women politicians